The 342d Bombardment Squadron is an inactive United States Air Force unit.  It was last assigned to the 4137th Strategic Wing.  It was last stationed at Robins Air Force Base, Georgia and was inactivated on 1 February 1963.

During World War II, the 342d Bombardment Squadron was a B-17 Flying Fortress squadron, assigned to the 97th Bombardment Group, Fifteenth Air Force. It earned two Distinguished Unit Citations.

History

World War II
The squadron was established as a Boeing B-17 Flying Fortress heavy bomb squadron in early 1942, and trained under Third Air Force in Florida. While training it flew antisubmarine patrols over the Gulf of Mexico and the Florida Atlantic coastline. It was deployed to the European Theater of Operations in June 1942, being assigned to VIII Bomber Command in England with B-17E aircraft.

Combat operations by the group began on 17 August 1942, when the squadron participated in the first Eighth Air Force heavy bomber mission of the war, attacking the Rouen-Sotteville marshalling yards in France.  It then continued long-range strategic bombardment of occupied Europe, attacking airfields, marshaling yards, industries, naval installations, and other targets in France and the Low Countries.

The squadron was deployed to Algeria in November 1942, assigned to the new Twelfth Air Force in North Africa and upgraded to B-17Fs. It raided shipping in the Mediterranean Sea and airfields, docks, harbors, and marshaling yards in north Africa, southern France, Sardinia, Sicily, and the southern Italian mainland in a campaign to cut supply lines to German forces in north Africa. It helped force the capitulation of Pantelleria Island in June 1943. It bombed in preparation for and in support of the invasions of Sicily and southern Italy in the summer and fall of 1943.

The squadron was reassigned to the new Fifteenth Air Force and the Mediterranean Theater of Operations in southern Italy, November 1943, flying a combination of B-17Fs and new B-17Gs. From Southern Italy it engaged in very long-range strategic bombardment missions, attacking targets in Italy, France, Germany, Czechoslovakia, Austria, Hungary, Romania, Bulgaria, Yugoslavia, and Greece, attacking oil refineries, marshalling yards, aircraft factories, and other strategic objectives. It participated in the first shuttle-bombing mission to Russia (Operation Frantic) in June 1944.

The squadron returned to the United States after the German capitulation in May 1945, and prepared for transition to Boeing B-29 Superfortress aircraft and deployment to Twentieth Air Force in the Pacific Theater. Japanese capitulation in August ended training activities; the squadron was demobilized and inactivated in October.

Strategic Air Command
The squadron was reactivated in 1946 under Strategic Air Command. It was equipped with B-29 Superfortresses and participated in numerous exercises, operational readiness inspections, and overseas deployments. One of these deployments involved the squadron's mission in West Germany and Berlin (then in East Germany) in July 1947. Just a month later, the unit was in Guam and Japan. It became part of SAC nuclear deterrent force.

The squadron began upgrading to the new Boeing B-50 Superfortress, an advanced version of the B-29 in 1949. The B-50 gave the unit the capability to carry heavy loads of conventional weapons faster and farther as well as being designed for atomic bomb missions if necessary.

By 1951, the emergence of the Soviet Mig interceptors in the skies of North Korea signaled the end of the propeller-driven B-50 as a first-line strategic bomber. The squadron received Boeing B-47 Stratojet jet bombers in 1955 and despite initial difficulties, the Stratojet became the mainstay of the medium-bombing strength of SAC all throughout the 1950s, deployed frequently to North Africa and England for Reflex exercises. The squadron began sending its B-47s to the Aerospace Maintenance and Regeneration Center at Davis–Monthan Air Force Base in 1959 when the aircraft was deemed no longer capable of penetrating Soviet airspace.

In 1960 the squadron was reassigned to the 4137th Strategic Wing, being re-equipped with Boeing B-52G Stratofortress intercontinental heavy bombers.  It moved to Robins Air Force Base, Georgia by SAC to disperse its heavy bomber force. It conducted worldwide strategic-bombardment training missions and provided nuclear deterrent. It was inactivated in 1963 when SAC inactivated its strategic wings, replacing them with permanent Air Force wings. The squadron was inactivated, with aircraft, personnel, and equipment being transferred to the 781st Bombardment Squadron.

Lineage
 Constituted as the "342d Bombardment Squadron" (Heavy) on 28 January 1942
 Activated on 3 February 1942
 Redesignated "342d Bombardment Squadron", Heavy on 6 March 1944
 Inactivated on 29 October 1945
 Redesignated "342d Bombardment Squadron", Very Heavy on 15 July 1946
 Activated on 4 August 1946
 Redesignated "342d Bombardment Squadron", Medium on 28 May 1948
 Redesignated "342d Bombardment Squadron", Heavy on 1 October 1959
 Discontinued and inactivated on 1 February 1963

Assignments
 97th Bombardment Group, 3 February 1942 – 29 October 1945
 97th Bombardment Group, 4 August 1946
 97th Bombardment Wing, 16 June 1952
 4137th Strategic Wing, 15 May 1960 – 1 February 1963

Stations

 MacDill Field, Florida, 3 February 1942
 Sarasota Army Air Field, Florida, 29 March 1942 – 16 May 1942
 RAF Grafton Underwood (USAAF Station 106), England, 9 June 1942 
 RAF Polebrook (USAAF Station 110), England, 8 September 1942 
 Maison Blanche Airport, Algiers, Algeria, c. 19 November 1942 
 Tafaraoui Airfield, Algeria, c. 22 November 1942
 Biskra Airfield, Algeria, 27 December 1942
 Chateaudun-du-Rhumel Airfield, Algeria, 18 February 1943
 Pont du Fahs Airfield, Tunisia, 10 August 1943

 Depienne Airfield, Tunisia, 14 August 1943
 Cerignola Airfield, Italy, c. 9 December 1943
 Amendola Airfield, Italy, 16 January 1944
 Marcianise Airfield, Italy, c. 1 October 1945 – 29 October 1945
 Smoky Hill Army Air Field (later Smoky Hill Air Force Base), Kansas, 4 August 1946
 Biggs Air Force Base, Texas, 18 May 1948
 Blytheville Air Force Base, Arkansas, 1 July 1959
 Robins Air Force Base, Georgia, 15 May 1960 – 1 February 1963

Aircraft
 Boeing B-17 Flying Fortress, 1942–1945
 Boeing B-29 Superfortress, 1946–1950
 Boeing B-50 Superfortress, 1950–1955
 Boeing B-47 Stratojet, 1955–1959
 Boeing B-52G Stratofortress, 1960–1963

See also

 Boeing B-17 Flying Fortress Units of the Mediterranean Theater of Operations
 List of B-52 Units of the United States Air Force

References

Notes
 Explanatory notes

 Citations

Bibliography

 
 
 
 
 

Bombardment squadrons of the United States Air Force
Military units and formations established in 1942
Bombardment squadrons of the United States Army Air Forces
World War II strategic bombing units